They Call Us Warriors is a 2018 Venezuelan documentary film about the female Venezuela national football team and their competition in the World Cup.

Plot 
After winning at the U17 South American Women Championship, as well as facing social and economic hardships to practice football discrimination in the environment of a machista sport, the Venezuelan national female football team, led by its captain Deyna Castellanos, has a chance to win the World Cup in Jordan, the first one for Venezuela, and to give a voice to women football in Venezuela. The documentary film features places from Naguanagua, Guasdualito, Mérida and Caracas in Venezuela, to Florida, in the United States.

Reception 
The film was screened at the Havana Film Festival, the Brooklyn Film Festival, the Atlanta Film Festival in April 2018 and on 29 September 2018 at the Women Sports Film Festival.

References

External links 
 
 They Call Us Warriors at FilmAffinity

2018 films
2018 documentary films
Venezuelan documentary films
2010s Spanish-language films
Documentary films about women's association football
Documentary films about Venezuela
Women in Venezuela